A list of films produced in Italy in 1992 (see 1992 in film):

External links
Italian films of 1992 at the Internet Movie Database

1992
Italian
Films